Rodrigo de Triana (born 1469 in Lepe, Huelva, Spain) was a Spanish sailor, believed to be the first European from the Age of Exploration to have seen the Americas. Born as Juan Rodríguez Bermejo, Triana was the son of hidalgo and potter Vicente Bermejo and Sereni Betancour. 

On October 12, 1492, while on Christopher Columbus' ship La Pinta, he sighted a land that was called Guanahani by the natives."" — The Diary of Christopher Columbus After spotting the Bahamian island at approximately two o'clock in the morning, he is reported to have shouted "" (Land! Land!). Columbus claims in his journal that he saw a light "like a little wax candle rising and falling" four hours earlier, "but it was so indistinct that he did not dare to affirm it was land." Rodrigo had spotted a small island in the Lucayas archipelago (known today as the Bahamas), in the Caribbean Sea. The island was named by Christopher Columbus as San Salvador, in honour of Jesus Christ and the salvation that finding land implied after that long journey.

After his return to Spain, Triana sailed to Africa.  

NASA's Deep Space Climate Observatory, a satellite originally intended to provide a near-continuous view of the entire Earth, was initially named Triana, after Rodrigo de Triana.

Footnotes

Christopher Columbus
1469 births
Year of death missing
People from the Province of Huelva
Spanish explorers of North America
15th-century Castilians